Clarinet Concerto No. 1 may refer to:

 Clarinet Concerto No. 1 (Spohr)
 Clarinet Concerto No. 1 (Weber)